Stillborn is an EP by Unit:187, released on November 4, 1997 by 21st Circuitry. In order for the songs to be played on the radio in the United States label owner Don Blanchard had to remove profanity from several of the tracks to create radio edits.

Reception

AllMusic awarded Stillborn two and a half out of five stars. Aiding & Abetting commented that the material featuring contributions from other musicians was of high quality but criticized the album for not living up to Loaded and said "the only real problem here is that three of the nine tracks are radio edits, which basically shorten good songs into mindless (and less interesting) snippets." Sonic Boom called the album "quite a disappointment" and "as a result, unless you are a radio DJ, don't bother with this EP as the new album Loaded has all of this material in a much better represented format." Fabryka Music Magazine awarded the album a two out of four.

Track listing

Personnel
Adapted from the Stillborn liner notes.

Unit:187
 Tod Law – lead vocals, remixing (6, 7, 8)
 John Morgan – programming, remixing (2, 3, 7, 8)
 Jed Simon – guitar, remixing (6, 8)
 Byron Stroud – bass guitar, remixing (6, 8)

Additional personnel
 Steven Seibold – remixing (5)
 Devin Townsend – remixing (3)

Production and design
 tara ntula – design

Release history

References

External links 
 

1997 EPs
Unit:187 albums
21st Circuitry EPs
Off Beat (label) albums